The Irish cricket team toured the United Arab Emirates to play the United Arab Emirates in February 2016. The tour consisted of two Twenty20 International (T20Is) matches and a 20-over tour match. The matches were in preparation for the 2016 ICC World Twenty20. The two-match series was drawn, with Ireland winning the first match and the United Arab Emirates winning the second. The second match of the series was the 500th T20I match since the format was introduced in 2005.

Squads

Tour match

20-over match: Danube Cricket Club v Ireland

T20I series

1st T20I

2nd T20I

References

External links
 Series home at ESPNcricinfo

2016 in Emirati cricket
2016 in Irish cricket
International cricket competitions in 2015–16
Ireland 2015